The Season of the Emergence was the second season of the lunar and civil Egyptian calendars. It fell after the Season of the Inundation and before the Season of the Harvest. In the modern Coptic calendar, the season falls between Paopi 10 and Tobi 10.

Names
The pronunciation of the Ancient Egyptian name for the Season of the Emergence is uncertain as the hieroglyphs do not record its vowels. It is conventionally transliterated Peret or Proyet. The name refers to the emergence of the fertile land beside the Nile from its annual flood and to the growth of vegetation and crops over the following season.

It is also known as Winter.

Lunar calendar
In the lunar calendar, the intercalary month was added as needed to maintain the heliacal rising of Sirius in the fourth month of the Season of the Harvest. This meant that the Season of the Emergence usually lasted from January to May. Because the precise timing of the flood varied, the months of "Emergence" no longer precisely reflected the state of the river but the season was usually the time for the planting and growth of Egyptian grain.

Civil calendar
In the civil calendar, the lack of leap years into the Ptolemaic and Roman periods meant the season lost about one day every four years and was not stable relative to the solar year or Gregorian calendar.

Months
The Season of the Emergence was divided into four months. In the lunar calendar, each began on a dawn when the waning crescent moon was no longer visible. In the civil calendar, each consisted of exactly 30 days divided into three 10-day weeks known as decans.

In ancient Egypt, these months were usually recorded by their number within the season: I, II, III, and IV Prt. They were also known by the names of their principal festivals, which came to be increasingly used after the Persian occupation. These then became the basis for the names of the months of the Coptic calendar. In the modern Coptic calendar, the season falls between Paopi 10 and Tobi 10.

See also
 Egyptian & Coptic calendars
 Egyptian units of time
 Temple of Kom Ombo

Notes

References

Egyptian calendar